Hughart is a surname. Notable people with the surname include:

Barry Hughart (born 1934), American fantasy novelist
Jim Hughart (born 1936), American jazz and pop bass player
Ron Hughart, American animation director
Veronica Hughart (1907-1977), American artist, architectural designer and journalist

See also
Hughart, West Virginia